This is a list of the highest settlements by country. Many of these are too small to be regarded as towns or cities. Only permanent settlements occupied year-round are included.  When possible, the highest point in the contiguous year-round settlement is listed, though average heights or the elevations of a central point may also be found.

The elevation of a settlement affects the social and physical arrangement of the place. In many cases, the cold climate in winter necessitates a particular style of house; the type of agriculture practised and the domestic animals kept there are limited; or the type of work carried on is specialised.

Sovereign, fully recognized countries

Countries with disputed sovereignty

Dependent countries and overseas territories 

This section includes all countries and territories that are listed by ISO 3166-1 but not listed in the above sections.

See also
Extreme points of Earth
List of highest cities
List of European cities by elevation
List of South American cities by elevation
List of highest United States cities by state
List of capital cities by altitude
List of countries by highest point

Notes

 Highest
Towns